The Lehigh Valley Phantoms are a professional ice hockey team based in Allentown, Pennsylvania. The team competes in the American Hockey League (AHL) and serves as the primary development team for the Philadelphia Flyers of the National Hockey League. 

The Phantoms have been the top minor league affiliate for the Flyers since the 1996–97 season, playing in Philadelphia as the Philadelphia Phantoms from 1996 until 2009, then in Glens Falls, New York as the Adirondack Phantoms from 2010 until 2013, and in Allentown as the Lehigh Valley Phantoms since 2014. 

The Lehigh Valley Phantoms play their home games at PPL Center, an 8,500 capacity, $282 million indoor arena that opened in downtown Allentown on September 10, 2014.

History

In March 2011, plans were announced for a new arena, the PPL Center, in downtown Allentown, Pennsylvania. Demolition at the arena site began in January 2012. In February 2012, it was announced that the Adirondack Phantoms, a franchise that originated as the Philadelphia Phantoms, would relocate to the PPL Center in Allentown from Glens Falls, New York. The franchise originally intended to begin play in Allentown in 2013, but due to litigation over the construction of PPL Center, the team did not play until the 2014–15 AHL season. The purple color used since the team's inception was replaced by electric blue when the team relocated to the Lehigh Valley.

The arena has been consistently full. During the 2015–16 season, the PPL Center was filled at a 97.9% capacity on average, and had 24 sellouts in the 38 Phantoms home games, including the last 13. The Phantoms finished seventh in the AHL attendance rankings with an average of 8,244 fans, surpassed only by teams with larger venues.

Mascot
On August 13, 2014, the Phantoms introduced their new mascot "meLVin". meLVin wears the number 55, which is LV in Roman numerals. The LV refers to Lehigh Valley. He became the Phantoms' third mascot after "Phlex" (Philadelphia Phantoms) and "Dax" (Adirondack Phantoms).

Season-by-season results 

Records as of May 3, 2022.

Current roster 
Updated March 20, 2023.

|}

Team captains 

 Colin McDonald, 2015–19
 Cal O'Reilly, 2020–present

Team records 

As of the 2020–21 season

Single season
Goals: Greg Carey, 31 (2017–18)
Assists: Phil Varone, 47 (2017–18)
Points: Phil Varone, 70 (2017–18)
Penalty minutes: Jay Rosehill, 219 (2014–15)
GAA: Jean-Francois Berube, 2.56 (2019–20)
SV%: Rob Zepp, .917 (2014–15)
Wins: Alex Lyon (2016–17), 27
Shutouts: Dustin Tokarski (2017–18), 5

Goaltending records need a minimum 25 games played by the goaltender

Career
Career goals: Greg Carey, 103
Career assists: Chris Conner, 128
Career points: Chris Conner, 199
Career penalty minutes: Tyrell Goulbourne, 313
Career goaltending wins: Alex Lyon, 75
Career shutouts: Alex Lyon, 6
Career games: Greg Carey, 277

Individual awards 

Les Cunningham Award (AHL Most Valuable Player)
Phil Varone 2017–18

First All-Star Team
T.J. Brennan 2016–17
Phil Varone: 2017–18

Second All-Star Team
T.J. Brennan 2017–18

Head coaches 
Terry Murray: 2014–2015
Scott Gordon: 2015–2018, 2019–2021
Kerry Huffman: interim 2018–19 season
Ian Laperriere: 2021–present

References

External links 

 Official website
 

 
2014 establishments in Pennsylvania
Ice hockey clubs established in 2014
Philadelphia Flyers minor league affiliates
Professional ice hockey teams in Pennsylvania
Sports in Allentown, Pennsylvania